Nagasaki 2nd district is a constituency of the House of Representatives in the Diet of Japan. It is located in Southern Nagasaki and covers parts of the city of Nagasaki (the former towns of Kinkai and Sotome), the cities of Shimabara, Isahaya, Saikai, Unzen and Minamishimabara as well as the Nishisonogi District with the towns of Togitsu and Nagayo. As of 2009, 335,195 eligible voters were registered in the district.

Before the electoral reform of 1994, the area was part of the multi-member Nagasaki 1st district where five Representatives had been elected by single non-transferable vote.

The district had been a safe LDP district from its creation until the landslide election of 2009 when incumbent Liberal Democrat Fumio Kyūma, former defence minister in the Hashimoto and Abe cabinets, lost his seat to Democrat newcomer Eriko Fukuda by 14,000 votes at record turnout.

List of representatives

Election results

References 

Districts of the House of Representatives (Japan)
Nagasaki Prefecture